Nicolaas (Cola) Debrot (4 May 1902 – 3 December 1981) was a writer, lawyer, medical doctor and politician.

Biography
Debrot was born in Kralendijk, the son of a plantation owner. In 1904, he moved from Bonaire to Curaçao, and then when he was 14 he moved to the Netherlands to attend school. He went to secondary school, and later to Utrecht University in the Netherlands, studying law and later medicine, where he also started his literary career. His debut, Mijn zuster de negerin (1935) is his best known. In the late 1940s, he returned to the Antilles and lived on Curaçao, where he established the foundations of Dutch-Antillian literature.

Debrot was also active as a politician. In 1952, Debrot became the Minister Plenipotentiary of the Netherlands Antilles and played a major role in reshaping the relationship between the Netherlands, the Antilles and Suriname. From 1962 to 1970, Debrot served as Governor of the Netherlands Antilles, the first to be born on one of the islands. In 1970, he retired to the Netherlands to dedicate his time to writing. He died in Amsterdam.

Cola Debrot Prize
In 1968, the Government of Curaçao, decided to institute yearly cultural award. The award was named after Cola Debrot. The annual prize can be awarded for either music, literature or science.

Cola Debrot Lectures
In 2008, the Werkgroep Caraïbische Letteren, an independent group within the Maatschappij der Nederlandse Letterkunde, which aims to promote and assist Caribbean literature, initiated the annual Cola Debrot lectures in Amsterdam. The first lecture was given by the Nobel Prize winning author Derek Walcott.

References

External links
Cola Debrot at Digital Library for Dutch Literature (in Dutch)
Cola Debrot Lectures at Werkgroep Caraïbische Letteren (in Dutch)

1902 births
1981 deaths
Bonaire politicians
Curaçao lawyers
Curaçao writers
Dutch Antillean physicians
Dutch male writers
Governors of the Netherlands Antilles
Ministers plenipotentiary (Netherlands Antilles)
Utrecht University alumni
20th-century Dutch lawyers